Sövestad is a locality in Ystad Municipality, Skåne County, Sweden, with 386 inhabitants in 2010. The medieval Sövestad Church is the centre of the village.

References 

Populated places in Ystad Municipality
Populated places in Skåne County